The Nyanza Province African Union (NPUA) was a political party in Kenya.

History
The party contested one seat in the Senate in the 1963 general elections, in which it was elected unopposed.

References

Defunct political parties in Kenya